The 2013 5-hour Energy 200 was the 11th stock car race of the 2013 NASCAR Nationwide Series and the 32nd iteration of the event. The race was held on Saturday, June 1, 2013, in Dover, Delaware at Dover International Speedway, a  permanent oval-shaped racetrack. The race took the scheduled 200 laps to complete. At race's end, Joey Logano, driving for Penske Racing, erased a five-second deficit with pit strategy and would go on to win his 19th career NASCAR Nationwide Series win and his first of the season. To fill out the podium, Brian Vickers and Matt Kenseth of Joe Gibbs Racing would finish second and third, respectively.

Background 

Dover International Speedway is an oval race track in Dover, Delaware, United States that has held at least two NASCAR races since it opened in 1969. In addition to NASCAR, the track also hosted USAC and the NTT IndyCar Series. The track features one layout, a 1-mile (1.6 km) concrete oval, with 24° banking in the turns and 9° banking on the straights. The speedway is owned and operated by Dover Motorsports.

The track, nicknamed "The Monster Mile", was built in 1969 by Melvin Joseph of Melvin L. Joseph Construction Company, Inc., with an asphalt surface, but was replaced with concrete in 1995. Six years later in 2001, the track's capacity moved to 135,000 seats, making the track have the largest capacity of sports venue in the mid-Atlantic. In 2002, the name changed to Dover International Speedway from Dover Downs International Speedway after Dover Downs Gaming and Entertainment split, making Dover Motorsports. From 2007 to 2009, the speedway worked on an improvement project called "The Monster Makeover", which expanded facilities at the track and beautified the track. After the 2014 season, the track's capacity was reduced to 95,500 seats.

Entry list

Practice 
The only practice session was held on Friday, May 31, at 12:40 AM EST, and would last for two hours and 20 minutes.

Qualifying 
Qualifying was held on Saturday, June 1, at 11:05 AM EST. Each driver would have two laps to set a fastest time; the fastest of the two would count as their official qualifying lap.

No drivers would fail to qualify.

Full qualifying results

Race results

References 

2013 NASCAR Nationwide Series
NASCAR races at Dover Motor Speedway
June 2013 sports events in the United States
2013 in sports in Delaware